Gregory Phillip Grunberg (born July 11, 1966) is an American film and television actor best known for starring as Eric Weiss in the ABC series Alias, Matt Parkman in the NBC series Heroes, Temmin "Snap" Wexley in Star Wars: The Force Awakens and Star Wars: The Rise of Skywalker, and Phil in A Star Is Born. He has often appeared in works produced and directed by his childhood friend J. J. Abrams, such as Felicity as Sean Blumberg. He was a recurring cast member in the first two seasons of the Showtime American television drama series Masters of Sex.

Early life
Grunberg was born in Los Angeles, California, the son of Sandy (née Klein) and Gerry Grunberg and had a Jewish upbringing. He attended University High School in West Los Angeles, class of 1984.

Career
Grunberg got his first credited role in Matt Stone and Trey Parker's 1998 film BASEketball. From 1998 to 2002, he appeared as Sean Blumberg on Felicity. He appeared from 2001 to 2006 as Eric Weiss on Alias. He left that series as a regular to star on the NBC sitcom, Grand Union. Since 2003, Abrams had planned a series called The Catch about a bounty hunter, starring Grunberg in the lead role. Suggested for both the 2004–05 and 2005–06 seasons, the series was never produced; however, a pilot episode was shot.

Abrams also cast Grunberg in a brief role as the pilot for the 2004 series Lost. Grunberg returned for the first-season finale, but his scenes were cut for time and were instead included on the season 1 DVD set. He also appeared in a small role in Mission: Impossible III, which Abrams directed.

Grunberg had a major role in the NBC TV show Heroes. He played police officer Matt Parkman, who has the power of telepathy. Grunberg guest-starred on House. He was offered a part in Star Trek, which Abrams directed, but was unable to take it because of a conflict with another project he was working on (although he provided the voice for Kirk's stepfather in the opening sequence). Grunberg voices FBI agent Ethan Thomas in the video game Condemned: Criminal Origins.

Outside of acting, Grunberg is known as one of the creators of the Yowza!! Android and iPhone application, a GPS-aware coupon-referring program.

He also voices Ant-Man in the animated series The Super Hero Squad Show. Grunberg was featured on the May/June 2009 cover of Making Music magazine. On May 17, 2010, Grunberg announced that he would be joining the cast of Love Bites.

He took up a minor role in the 2011 neo-noir detective videogame L.A. Noire, in which he provided both voice and facial motion capture as murder suspect Hugo Moller. On November 7, 2011, he appeared as a guest star on an episode of the TV series Hawaii Five-0 with former Heroes co-star Masi Oka. He also appeared as a special guest star on the March 14, 2012, episode of the TV series Psych.

In 2013, Grunberg appeared in one episode during the first season of the TV series Masters of Sex as the character Gene Moretti, a rich business man. The part was expanded in 2014 to 4 episodes during the second season.

In February 2016, it was revealed that Grunberg will co-host a late night talk show with Kevin Smith titled Geeking Out on AMC.

Since 2019, Grunberg has been a recurring guest star on the syndicated game show 25 Words or Less.

In 2021, he appeared as a guest star on an episode of 9-1-1: Lone Star in the role of a father fighting for the life of his son, who suffers from epilepsy. This echoes Grunberg's real life activism due to his own son's epilepsy.

Personal life
In 1992, Grunberg married Elizabeth Dawn Wershow. They have three children: Jake, Ben, and Sam. Jake has epilepsy, which has inspired Grunberg to take an active role in raising awareness of the neurological disorder and raising funds for research.

He often organizes charity efforts to raise funds for the Pediatric Epilepsy Project in Los Angeles. In the past, this has included events such as an auction of guitars handpainted by celebrities such as Donald Trump, Pink and Grunberg's Alias co-stars Jennifer Garner and Michael Vartan as well as concerts by the Band From TV that includes Grunberg and Hugh Laurie and an online auction of cartoons drawn of his Heroes costars.

In March 2007, Greg served as the chair of the first National Walk for Epilepsy, presented by the Epilepsy Foundation.

In 2009, Grunberg launched Talk About It, a website dedicated to epilepsy education and awareness, featuring many of Greg's co-stars and celebrity friends, including Garner, Larter, Pasdar, Ramamurthy, Ventimiglia, Panettiere, as well as Zachary Quinto, Chris Pine, Dr. Drew Pinsky, Ron Rifkin, and John Mayer. The site features Grunberg interviewing top epilepsy experts on the need to talk more about epilepsy, and includes a section for people all over the world to talk about it.

Grunberg was a participant in the first-ever national television advertising campaign supporting donations to Jewish federations. The program featured "film and television personalities celebrating their Jewish heritage and promoting charitable giving to the Jewish community" and included Marlee Matlin, Joshua Malina, Kevin Weisman, and Jonathan Silverman.
 He made a tongue-in-cheek promotional video for Temple Judea Religious School lambasting boring Hebrew Religious schools.

Grunberg is one of the hosts of Social Tron Live, a Twitch channel, in a segment called Greg Grunberg live where he plays video games with fellow celebrities, comedians, and popular Twitch streamers.

Filmography

Film

Television

Video Games

Music video

References

External links

 
 

1966 births
Living people
Male actors from Los Angeles
American male film actors
American male television actors
American male video game actors
American male voice actors
Jewish American male actors
University High School (Los Angeles) alumni
20th-century American male actors
21st-century American male actors
21st-century American Jews